The 1914 Currie Cup was the 11th edition of the Currie Cup, the premier domestic rugby union competition in South Africa.

See also

 Currie Cup

References

1914
1914 in South African rugby union
Currie